Omphalotropis hieroglyphica  is a species of minute salt marsh snail with an operculum, a terrestrial gastropod mollusk, or micromollusk, in the family Assimineidae. This species is endemic to Mauritius.

References

	

Gastropods described in 1838
Assimineidae
Taxonomy articles created by Polbot
Endemic fauna of Mauritius